Gerald Avery Mays (November 24, 1939 – July 17, 1994) was an American professional football player who was a defensive end for the Dallas Texans/Kansas City Chiefs. He played college football for the SMU Mustangs.

Early years
Mays put together an all-state career at Sunset High School before heading to Southern Methodist University, where he served as co-captain for the Mustangs and earned All-Southwest Conference honors at defensive tackle.
 
A fifth round draft selection of the American Football League's Dallas Texans in 1961, Mays turned down the National Football League's Minnesota Vikings, in order to play near his home in Dallas.  He soon became a force at defensive tackle on the Texans' line, continuing his dominance at defensive end when the team relocated in 1963 to become the Kansas City Chiefs.

Combining emotion and durability with a  competitive nature, Mays was a six-time AFL All-Star, and was selected to the All-Star team at two different positions.  He played in 126 straight games for the AFL Texans and Chiefs, and used his speed, agility and strong "second effort" to once recover and return a Jets' fumble 58 yards for a touchdown. His contribution to the Chiefs' strong defense helped them defeat the Vikings, 23-7, in Super Bowl IV. He was a captain in Super Bowl I and Super Bowl IV.

Mays was named to the All-time All-AFL Team in 1970 and announced his retirement after that season.  He then returned to Dallas to work for a construction company owned by his father, Avery.  He died of malignant melanoma cancer in 1994, two years after the death (from cancer) of his former teammate, Buck Buchanan. The other starting defensive end from the Super Bowl team, Aaron Brown, was killed in 1997 when struck by a car from behind, leaving Curley Culp as the lone survivor of the Chiefs' vaunted front four from the championship club up until Culp's death in November 2021.

Mays is a Member of the Sunset High School Hall of Fame.

See also
List of American Football League players

1939 births
1994 deaths
American football defensive linemen
SMU Mustangs football players
Dallas Texans (AFL) players
Kansas City Chiefs players
American Conference Pro Bowl players
American Football League All-Time Team
Deaths from melanoma
Deaths from cancer in Texas
Players of American football from Dallas
American Football League players